The 384th Air Refueling Squadron is an active United States Air Force unit, stationed at Fairchild Air Force Base, Washington, where it is assigned to the 92d Operations Group and operates the Boeing KC-135 Stratotanker aircraft conducting air refueling missions.

The first predecessor of the squadron is the 584th Bombardment Squadron, a Martin B-26 Marauder unit that served in the European Theater of Operations, where it earned a Distinguished Unit Citation and a French Croix de Guerre with Palm.  After V-E Day, it served with the occupation forces in Germany until inactivating in 1946.

The 384th was activated in 1955 at Westover Air Force Base, Massachusetts, where it served as a Strategic Air Command air refueling unit until inactivating in 1966.  It was activated again in 1973 and has performed global refueling missions since then.  The two squadrons were consolidated into a single unit in 1985.

History

World War II

Training in the United States
The 584th Bombardment Squadron was activated at MacDill Field, Florida as one of the original four squadrons of the 394th Bombardment Group. It began to train with the Martin B-26 Marauder, performing most of its training at Kellogg Field, Michigan.  It departed for the European Theater of Operations (ETO) in mid-February 1944.

Combat in Europe
The squadron was established at RAF Boreham, which was to be its station until after D-Day, in mid March, and flew its first combat mission on 23 March, less than two weeks after its arrival in the ETO.  It helped prepare for the invasion of Normandy by participating in Operation Crossbow, striking V-1 flying bomb and V-2 rocket launch sites.  It also carried out attacks on marshalling yards, bridges, gun emplacements and airfields.  Not all targets were near the intended invasion landing areas.  For example, in April, the squadron participated in a heavy attack on the marshalling yard at Mechlen, Belgium.Later that month, it encountered particularly heavy flak in an attack on Heuringhem, in which the airplane leading the group formation received 264 holes. However, bombing results were not as accurate as desired, and the squadron was removed from operations for a week for additional training.  On D-Day it attacked gun emplacements at Cherbourg Naval Base, afterwards striking lines of communications, fuel storage sites and enemy strong points.

The squadron moved to RAF Holmsley South on 24 July, in a general move by the units of the 98th Bombardment Wing to bases closer to the invasion area, and on the following day supported Operation Cobra, the breakout at Saint Lo.  Between 7 and 9 August, the squadron made five attacks on strongly defended targets in northern France.  This operation resulted in the award of the Distinguished Unit Citation to the squadron.  Later that month, the squadron moved to its first base on the continent, Tour-en-Bessin Airfield, in France.  From this base, the 584th attacked strong points at Brest, France and later began attacking targets in Germany from its bases on the continent.  During the Battle of the Bulge, the squadron attacked lines of communications to prevent reinforcements from reaching the attacking German forces.  it participated in Operation Clarion, intended to destroy the remaining elements of the German transportation system.  In addition to attacking transportation and storage facilities, toward the end of the war, the squadron dropped propaganda leaflets over occupied territory, which included the squadron's last combat mission.

Occupation and inactivation
Following V-E Day, the squadron moved to Kitzingen Airfield, Germany, where it became part of the Army of Occupation.  In December, it began to transition into the Douglas A-26 Invader. However, most personnel were rotating home for separation from the military, and in February, the squadron was transferred on paper to Bolling Field, District of Columbia and was inactivated there at the end of March.

Air refueling operations

KC-97 era

The squadron was activated at Westover Air Force Base, Massachusetts on 1 April 1955, when Strategic Air Command (SAC) took over Westover from Military Air Transport Service and organized the 4050th Air Refueling Wing there.  This was part of a program by SAC to station most of its tankers into the northeastern United States. The 4050th was one of two tanker wings created in New England.  This based the squadron ahead of the faster Boeing B-47 Stratojets it would refuel if the Emergency War Order were executed, and on their programmed route.

The 384th was equipped with Boeing KC-97 Stratofreighters.  It refueled SAC bombers, primarily in the North Atlantic area, and Tactical Air Command aircraft, primarily for fighter deployments and unit movements.  In addition to deployments of individual crews and aircraft, the squadron deployed as a unit to Ernest Harmon Air Force Base, Newfoundland in the spring of 1956 and 1957 and to Lajes Air Base, Azores (Operation Short Punt) in the fall of 1963.

Starting in 1960, one third of the squadron's aircraft were maintained on fifteen minute alert, fully fueled and ready for combat to reduce vulnerability to a Soviet missile strike.  This was increased to half the squadron's aircraft in 1962. Ground alert for the KC-97 terminated on 10 November 1965.

The squadron's parent 4050th Air Refueling Wing was replaced by the newly constituted 499th Air Refueling Wing which assumed its mission, personnel, and equipment on 1 January 1963.
During the Cuban Missile Crisis SAC went to DEFCON 2 on 22 October 1962, putting  all the squadron's planes on alert.   On 29 October  additional KC-97s were dispersed to bases in Canada and the Azores to provide refueling for B-47s on increased alert status.  On 21 November SAC went to DEFCON 3. Dispersed tankers were recalled on 24 November and on 27 November SAC returned to normal alert posture.

However, the slow speed of the propeller-driven KC-97 made it incompatible with jet bombers, which had to descend from their cruising altitude to one where the KC-97 operated, resulting in the bomber burning much of the fuel it had just received in its climb back to its operating altitude.  Although this problem was alleviated by adding two General Electric J47 jets to the KC-97, the only real solution was an all jet tanker.  The squadron began to draw down, losing its last aircraft in late 1965 and no longer being manned after February 1966.  It was inactivated along with its parent 499th Air Refueling Wing on 25 June 1966.

KC-135 era
The squadron was reactivated in September 1973 at McConnell Air Force Base, Kansas, where it was assigned to the 384th Bombardment Wing, flying Boeing KC-135A Stratotankers. It flew worldwide aerial refueling sorties. In September 1985, the 384th was consolidated with the 584th Bombardment Squadron, in a program to unite World War II units with tactical units that had been activated after the war.

On 18 December 1989, The squadron deployed aircraft and personnel to Barksdale Air Force Base, Louisiana.  The following day, these elements flew to designated refueling tracks to support airlift aircraft transporting ground troops to Panama in Operation Just Cause.  Refueling sorties also supported McDonnell Douglas F-15 Eagles flying fighter cap near Cuba, General Dynamics EF-111 Ravens providing jamming and Boeing E-3 Sentry aircraft providing command and control of the force.  It supported Desert Shield and  Desert Storm from by deploying aircrews and aircraft assigned to provisional units from August 1990 to March 1991.

The 384th went through a series of assignment changes in the early 1990s due to organizational changes in the Air Force.  The implementation of the Objective Wing organization brought the flying elements of the 384th Wing together under the 384th Operations Group. In June 1992, SAC was disestablished and its refueling units were transferred to Air Mobility Command (AMC).  As a result, the squadron was separated from the 384th Bomb Wing and assigned to the 19th Operations Group.  This assignment lasted until 1994, when AMC assumed control of McConnell and the squadron was assigned to the 22d Operations Group.  The squadron's personnel and eqiupment and was withdrawn at the end of September 2016 and the squadron remained at McConnell as a paper unit as the 22nd began its conversion to the Boeing KC-46 Pegasus.

The squadron moved to Fairchild Air Force Base, Washington on 23 March 2017, there it once again was manned and equipped.  The date was chosen because it was the 73d anniversary of the squadron's first combat mission during World War II.

Lineage
 584th Bombardment Squadron
 Constituted as the 584th Bombardment Squadron (Medium) on 15 February 1943
 Activated on 5 March 1943
 Redesignated 584th Bombardment Squadron, Medium on 9 October 1944
 Redesignated 584th Bombardment Squadron, Light on 3 December 1945
 Inactivated on 31 March 1946
 Consolidated with the 384th Air Refueling Squadron on 19 September 1985

 384th Air Refueling Squadron
 Constituted on 3 March 1955
 Activated on 1 April 1955
 Discontinued and inactivated on 25 June 1966
 Redesignated 384th Air Refueling Squadron, Heavy on 19 June 1973
 Activated on 30 September 1973
 Consolidated with the 584th Bombardment Squadron on 19 September 1985
 Redesignated 384th Air Refueling Squadron on 1 September 1991

Assignments
 394th Bombardment Group, 5 March 1943 – 31 March 1946
 4050th Air Refueling Wing, 1 April 1955 (attached to Eighth Air Force 27 April – 27 June 1956, 21 May – 25 June 1957)
 499th Air Refueling Wing, 1 January 1963 – 25 June 1966
 384th Bombardment Wing, 30 September 1973 – 30 September 1991
 384th Operations Group 30 September 1991
 19th Operations Group, 1 June 1992
 22d Operations Group, 1 January 1994
 92d Operations Group, 23 March 2017 – present

Stations
 MacDill Field, Florida, 5 March 1943
 Ardmore Army Air Field, Oklahoma, 12 July 1943
 Kellogg Field, Michigan, 23 August 1943 – 15 February 1944
 RAF Boreham (Station 161), England, 11 March 1944
 RAF Holmsley South (Station 455), England, 24 July 1944
 Tour-en-Bessin Airfield (A-13), France, 20 August 1944
 Orleans-Bricy Airfield (A-50), France, 21 September 1944
 Cambrai-Niergnies Airport (A-74 ), France, 8 October 1944
 Venlo Airfield (Y-55 ), Netherlands, 5 May 1945
 Kitzingen Airfield (R-6), Germany, September 1945
 Bolling Field, Washington, DC, 15 February 1946 – 1 March 1946
 Westover Air Force Base, Massachusetts, 1 April 1955 – 25 June 1966 (deployed to Ernest Harmon Air Force Base, Newfoundland 27 April – 27 June 1956, 21 May – 25 June 1957); Lajes Air Base, Azores (28 September – c. 28 December 1963)
 McConnell Air Force Base, Kansas, 30 September 1973
 Fairchild Air Force Base, Washington, 23 March 2017 – present

Aircraft
 Martin B-26 Marauder (1943–1945)
 Douglas A-26 Invader (1945–1946)
 Boeing KC-97 Stratofreighter (1955–1965)
 Boeing KC-135A Stratotanker (1973–1977)
 Boeing KC-135R/T Stratotanker (1978–2016, 2017–present)

Awards and campaigns

References
 Notes

 Citations

Bibliography

 
 
 
 
 
 
 
 
 
 
 
 
 

Military units and formations in Washington (state)
Air refueling squadrons of the United States Air Force